The Thatcher CX4 is an American-designed aircraft for amateur construction designed by David Thatcher of Pensacola, Florida and plans are supplied by Thatcher Aircraft, Inc.

Westberry Manufacturing supplies many parts and kits for the aircraft.

Design and development
The CX4 is a low wing, single-seat, conventional landing gear equipped aircraft, designed to be simple to build and safe to fly. The name of the plane, CX4, is taken from an old radio show featuring Hop Harrigan, whose plane was called CX4.

The aircraft is all metal, 6061-T6 aluminium, except the cowling. The aluminum main gear legs are sourced from a Monnett Sonerai with hydraulic disc toe brakes. It has a heater and ventilation system for all season flying. The aircraft can be built with an optional 3 gal aux fuel tank. The CX4's standard specified powerplant is a Volkswagen air-cooled engine. The design load factor is 3.8 g, with an ultimate load of 5.7 g.

The CX4 first flew in 2004. As of April, 2017, there were 55 flying CX4s in Australia, Brazil, Canada, New Zealand, South Africa, and the United States. The fleet had flown  3316.6 hours total.

Specifications (Thatcher CX4)

See also

References

General Aviation News Cover Story on Thatcher CX4
Air-Britain : Photographic Images Collection

External links

 Thatcher CX4 home page
 Video of CX4 in flight & interview with designer, David Thatcher

Homebuilt aircraft
2000s United States sport aircraft
Low-wing aircraft
Single-engined tractor aircraft
Aircraft first flown in 2004